Archie L. Lang (July 14, 1920 – February 17, 2016) was an American actor known for Going Berserk, Reform School Girls, Blow Out, Jinxed, and Bonanza: The Return.

Early life
Lang was born in 1920 in Chicago, Illinois to Archie and Gladys Lang. He had 4 siblings. Lang graduated from St. Benedict's College. He received a master's degree in music from Columbia University in New York City. Lang entered the United States Navy during World War II.

Career
Lang started his career as a singer in the Holiday Ice Review. He was the television announcer and program host for WKRP in Cincinnati. Lang produced the nationally renowned Ruth Page version of The Nutcracker for the Chicago Tribune Charities. He guest starred in many television programs including Benson, The Incredible Hulk, The Love Boat, Knots Landing, Three's Company, Love Street, and Early Edition. Lang  was in several theatre productions including Michael Nesmith's Elephant Parts which won a Grammy Award at the 24th ceremony. He was in the made-for-TV-movies Baby Comes Home, Children of Divorce, Seduced, and Bonanza: The Return. He was in several films including Jinxed, Blow Out, Reform School Girls , and Going Berserk. Lang performed at the Arie Crown Theatre for 25 years.

Personal life and death
Lang was with Georgietta Raikes for more than 20 years. He had one daughter (Denise) and one son (Michael). Lang died on February 17, 2016, at aged 95 in Kensington Center in Elizabethtown, Kentucky.

Filmography

Film

Television

References

External links
 
 

1920 births
2016 deaths
American male film actors
American male television actors
Male actors from Chicago
United States Navy personnel of World War II
Columbia University School of the Arts alumni
College of Saint Benedict and Saint John's University alumni
20th-century American male actors